Helvibis monticola is a species of comb-footed spider in the family Theridiidae. It is found in Brazil.

References

Theridiidae
Spiders described in 1891
Spiders of Brazil